Igor Anatolyevich Bobrin (Russian: Игорь Анатольевич Бобрин) (born 14 November 1953 in Leningrad) is a Russian former competitive figure skater who represented the Soviet Union. He is the 1981 European champion, the 1981 World bronze medalist, and a four-time (1978, 1980–1982) Soviet national champion. Bobrin placed 6th at the 1980 Winter Olympics.

Career
During his competitive career, Bobrin was known for being a particularly creative free skater. He invented an unusual horizontal-twisting jump sometimes called a "log jump" or "Bobrinover".  At one of his first international competitions, the 1972 Winter Universiade, a contemporary review noted that even the pros were puzzled by the jump, which was described as "somewhat like an Arabian cartwheel, only performed going straight ahead". He was coached by Igor Moskvin and since 1980 by Yuri Ovchinnikov.

Following his competitive career, Bobrin created his own ice theater. He currently skates with Moscow Stars On Ice and works as a coach and choreographer. He choreographed Elena Berezhnaya and Anton Sikharulidze's competitive Chaplin program.

In 2011–2012, Bobrin appeared on the panel of judges for the television show "Cup of Professionals" on Russian television Channel One.

Personal life
Bobrin was first married to Natalia Ovchinnikova, with whom he has a son, Maxim, born in 1977. In 1983 he married the future Olympic champion in ice dancing, Natalia Bestemianova.

Results

References

 Skatabase: 1980s Olympics
 Moscow Stars On Ice

Russian male single skaters
Soviet male single skaters
Olympic figure skaters of the Soviet Union
Figure skaters at the 1980 Winter Olympics
Figure skating choreographers
1953 births
Living people
World Figure Skating Championships medalists
European Figure Skating Championships medalists
Figure skaters from Saint Petersburg
Honoured Coaches of Russia
Competitors at the 1972 Winter Universiade